The 1957–58 season was the 59th season of competitive league football in the history of English football club Wolverhampton Wanderers. They played in the First Division, then the highest level of English football, for a 21st consecutive year.

The club won the League championship for a second time, four years after their first title, scoring over 100 goals in the process.

Wolves achieved the double over local rivals Aston Villa, part of a run of seven between 1957 and 1960.

Results

Football League

A total of 22 teams competed in the First Division in the 1957–58 season. Each team would play every other team twice, once at their stadium, and once at the opposition's. Two points were awarded to teams for each win, one point per draw, and none for defeats. 

Final table

Results by round

FA Cup

Players Used 

Eddie Clamp	41	4	45
Norman Deeley	41	4	45
Jimmy Murray	41	4	45
Peter Broadbent	40	4	44
Eddie Stuart	40	4	44
Gerry Harris	39	4	43
Jimmy Mullen	38	4	42
Billy Wright	38	4	42
Malcolm Finlayson	28	4	32
Ron Flowers	28	1	29
Bobby Mason	20	4	24
Bill Slater	14	3	17
Colin Booth	13	0	13
Dennis Wilshaw	12	0	12
George Showell	7	0	7
Noel Dwyer	5	0	5
Ron Howells	2	0	2
Alan Jackson	2	0	2
Gwyn Jones	2	0	2
Jackie Henderson	1	0	1
Micky Lill	1	0	1

Top scorer

Most appearances

Transfers

In

Out

References

1957–58
Wolverhampton Wanderers F.C.
1958